Josefina Barceló Bird de Romero  (February 14, 1901 — April 15, 1979) was a Puerto Rican civic leader and politician, leader of the Liberal Party of Puerto Rico after the death of her father Antonio Rafael Barceló in 1938. She is one of the twelve women honored with a plaque in "La Plaza en Honor a la Mujer Puertorriqueña" (Plaza in Honor of Puerto Rican Women), in San Juan.

Early life
Maria Antonia Josefina Barceló Bird was born in Fajardo, Puerto Rico, the daughter of lawyer and politician Antonio Rafael Barceló and Maria Georgina "Josefina" Bird Arias. Her paternal grandfather, Jaime José Barceló Miralles, was an immigrant to Puerto Rico from Palma, Majorca; her maternal grandfather, Jorge Bird León, was a sugar manufacturer. Josefina Barceló Bird finished her education at the College of the Sacred Heart, a convent school in Kenwood, Albany, New York.

Career
After literate Puerto Rican women gained the vote in 1929, Josefina Barceló de Romero worked on woman-to-woman voter education efforts in San Juan, and she was active in the women's organization of the Liberal Party. Among her responsibilities was arranging childcare, meals, and transportation for new women voters. She joined the Central Board of the Liberal Party in 1936. Josefina Barceló Bird de Romero was elected president of the Liberal Party after her father died in 1938. She was the first woman elected to lead a major political party in Puerto Rico. She continued to hold leadership positions in the party until she resigned and the party dissolved in 1948. She ran unsuccessfully for an at-large Senate seat in 1944.

Personal life and legacy
Josefina Barceló Bird married Antonio Romero Moreno in 1918. They had three children (Gloria, Calixto, Carlos) and also raised Antonio's nephew. Her son Carlos Romero Barceló was elected mayor of San Juan in 1968, and later served as Governor of Puerto Rico; in 2017, he was appointed shadow senator representing Puerto Rico in the United States Senate.

Josefina Barceló de Romero died in 1979, aged 77 years. She is one of the twelve women honored with a plaque in the "Plaza en Honor a la Mujer Puertorriqueña" (Plaza in Honor of Puerto Rican Women) in San Juan. There is a public elementary school named for Josefina Barceló, at Bayamon, Puerto Rico.

See also

List of Puerto Ricans
History of women in Puerto Rico

Notes

References

People from Fajardo, Puerto Rico
20th-century Puerto Rican politicians
Puerto Rican party leaders
20th-century Puerto Rican women politicians
1901 births
1979 deaths
20th-century American women